Scouting in The Bahamas began in 1912. For the history of Scouting in the Bahamas generally see Scouting in the Bahamas.

The Boy Scouts Association of the United Kingdom first registered a Bahamas troop of Boy Scouts on 19 March 1913 and formed its Bahamas Local Association. The Boy Scouts Association Bahamas Local Association became The Boy Scouts Association Bahamas Branch which changed its name to The Scout Association Bahamas Branch. Following The Bahamas becoming an independent nation in 1973, The Scout Association of the Bahamas was constituted on 1 August 1974 and succeeded The Scout Association Bahamas Branch. The Association became a member of the World Organization of the Scout Movement in the same year. The Scout Association of the Bahamas was incorporated on 19 November 1975.

The coeducational Scout Association of the Bahamas had 1,060 members in 2010.

The Scouts own a  recreational site in Adelaide Village, New Providence. The site was donated to the Scouts by the Bahamian government in 1926. It is used for activities such as camping and hiking.

The emblem of The Scout Association of the Bahamas features a very stylized marlin and flamingo head, topped by a rounded black arrowhead, in the colors of the flag of the Bahamas. Until 2015, the Association's emblem included a marlin and flamingo, the heraldic supporters of the coat of arms of the Bahamas, as well as the flag of the Bahamas.

See also
 The Bahamas Girl Guides Association

External links
 The Scout Association of The Bahamas

References

World Organization of the Scout Movement member organizations
Scouting and Guiding in the Bahamas
Youth organizations established in 1913
1913 establishments in the Bahamas